Robert Clements (born December 11, 1950) is an American politician and businessman.

Clements was born in Lincoln, Nebraska. He graduated from Elmwood High School in Elmwood, Nebraska in 1969. Clements received his bachelor's degree in 1973 from University of Nebraska–Lincoln. Clements is a banker at America Exchange Bank in Elmwood, Nebraska. On February 6, 2017, Clements was appointed to the Nebraska Legislature replacing Bill Kintner who resigned. He is involved with the Republican Party.

Clements became a leading state election denier by embracing "the Big Lie" (President Trump's false claims of a stolen election) following the 2020 presidential contest by insisting Donald Trump actually won. Clements signed a public letter demanding a "forensic audit of every state election" similar to the fruitless 2021 Maricopa County presidential ballot audit. That same year, he joined a fringe right-wing group, the Nebraska Freedom Coalition, in asking for a state-backed effort to audit the 2020 Nebraska election results, specifically in Douglas and Sarpy counties, despite no evidence of fraud. Clements claimed that he was baffled how both Democrat Joe Biden and Republican Rep. Don Bacon could win in Nebraska's 2nd Congressional District, despite the fact the district experienced a similar split in 2008.

Electoral history

Notes

1950 births
Living people
People from Cass County, Nebraska
Politicians from Lincoln, Nebraska
University of Nebraska–Lincoln alumni
Businesspeople from Nebraska
Republican Party Nebraska state senators
21st-century American politicians